Chaykhansar (also Romanized as Chākhānesar; also known as Chākhānehsar, Chakhānī, and Chakhānī Sar) is a village in Siahkalrud Rural District, Chaboksar District, Rudsar County, Gilan Province, Iran. At the 2006 census, its population was 981, in 316 families.

References 

Populated places in Rudsar County